Christopher Paul Bisson (born 21 July 1975) is an English actor, known for portraying the roles of Vikram Desai in Coronation Street (1999–2002), Kash Karib in Shameless (2004–2007, 2009), and Jai Sharma in Emmerdale (2009–present).

Television
Bisson first appeared on television as J.J. in Children's Ward in 1990. He went on to appear in Prime Suspect, Holby City and as Vikram Desai in Coronation Street. Then as 'Saleem Khan' in the 1999 film East Is East. Kash Karib in Shameless and Jai Sharma in Emmerdale. He appeared in Perfect Day: The Wedding (2005), Perfect Day: The Funeral (2006; Channel 5) and the feature film Stepdad (filmed in February 2007). He participated in the Channel 4 documentary Empire's Children (2007).

Bisson appeared in the Valentine's Day 2009 episode of Casualty, and on the last series of Hotel Babylon. He returned to make a one-off appearance in Shameless in April 2009, where his character was killed off.

In September 2009, Bisson joined the cast of Emmerdale, as part of the newly cast Sharma family, playing Jai Sharma. Bisson temporarily departed Emmerdale on 24 January 2013, due to the birth of his child. He later returned at the end of March 2013.

Bisson appeared in the second series of the ITV reality show I'm a Celebrity Get Me Out of Here!. He and his family appeared on All Star Family Fortunes in October 2011.

In 2012, he appeared in the CBBC series 12 Again where he revealed he once failed to show up for a date at the cinema with Anna Friel at the time.

On 15 December 2013, Bisson took part in The Chase: Celebrity Special to raise money for his selected charity.

On 18 June 2014, he took part in All Star Mr & Mrs with his partner.

On 11 October 2020, he appeared on the ITV game show, Tipping Point Lucky Stars which culminated in him winning the jackpot of £20,000 for his charity.

Personal life
Bisson was born in Wythenshawe, Manchester. His father is from Trinidad. Bisson is Catholic.

Filmography

Film

Television

Awards and nominations

References

External links

1975 births
Living people
English people of Trinidad and Tobago descent
English people of Indian descent
Alumni of the University of Salford
Actors from Manchester
English Roman Catholics
English male film actors
English male soap opera actors
I'm a Celebrity...Get Me Out of Here! (British TV series) participants
People from Wythenshawe